"Expensive" is a hip hop song by Ty Dolla Sign, featuring vocals from rapper Nicki Minaj. The song was released on August 28, 2020 as the second single from Ty Dolla Sign's third studio album, Featuring Ty Dolla Sign. The song was released alongside an official music video.

Background
Ty previewed the record along with another off Dream House that featured the rapper YG on April 12, 2020. The original version of the song featured G-Eazy and leaked in full August 6, 2020. The final version with Minaj was released on August 28, 2020.

Music video
The official music video coincided with the single release. It features Ty's girlfriend coming home with a luxury vehicle full of gifts and wrapped boxes. Minaj uses green screen technology and only appears from the waist up.

Personnel
Credits adapted from Tidal.

 Ty Dolla Sign – lead artist, producer
 Nicki Minaj – featured artist
 OkayJJack – additional production
 BlueySport – producer
 WILLVZ – producer
 James Royo – producer
 Nicolas De Porcel - mastering
 Mixed by Ali - mixing

Charts

Release history

References

2020 singles
2020 songs
Atlantic Records singles
Ty Dolla Sign songs
Nicki Minaj songs
Songs written by Ty Dolla Sign
Songs written by Nicki Minaj